Frea unipunctata is a species of beetle in the family Cerambycidae. It was described by Stephan von Breuning in 1942.

References

unipunctata
Beetles described in 1942